Cornuscoparia schlaginhaufeni is a species of beetle in the family Cerambycidae. It was described by Heller in 1910, originally under the genus Jonthophana. It is known from Papua New Guinea.

References

Lamiini
Beetles described in 1910